The Sound of Bute is a broad channel or sound separating the islands of Arran and Bute on the west coast of Scotland.

The sound leads up from the lower Firth of Clyde passes the island of Inchmarnock and splits into the Kyles of Bute, Loch Fyne and round the north end of Arran into the Kilbrannan Sound.

References

Bute
Bute
Landforms of North Ayrshire